Eureka Township is a township in Saline County, Kansas, in the United States.

Eureka Township was organized in 1873.

References

Townships in Saline County, Kansas
Townships in Kansas
1873 establishments in Kansas
Populated places established in 1873